The year 1999 was the 28th year after the independence of Bangladesh. It was also the fourth year of the first term of the Government of Sheikh Hasina.

Incumbents

 President: Shahabuddin Ahmed
 Prime Minister: Sheikh Hasina
 Chief Justice: A. T. M. Afzal (until 31 May), Mustafa Kamal (starting 1 June)

Demography

Climate

Economy

Note: For the year 1999 average official exchange rate for BDT was 49.09 per US$.

Events
 10 January – The World Bank announced that tests on water wells in Bangladesh have shown that about 40% are contaminated with arsenic.
 6 March - A terrorist bomb attack on an event of Bangladesh Udichi Shilpigoshthi in Jessore left 10 people dead and around 150 injured.
 31 May – Bangladesh defeated Pakistan in a 1999 Cricket World Cup group match.
 8 October - Another terrorist bomb attack on an Ahmadiyya Mosque in Khulna killed 8 and injured 30.
 14 October - The U.N. General Assembly elected Bangladesh to non- permanent membership on the Security Council for 2 year.
 17 November – 21 February is declared International Mother Language Day in the 30th General Conference of UNESCO.
 11 December - 50 killed as Bangladesh ferry capsizes.

Awards and Recognitions

International Recognition
 Angela Gomes, the Founder and Executive Director of the non-profit organization Banchte Shekha, was awarded Ramon Magsaysay Award.

Independence Day Award

Ekushey Padak
 Hasan Azizul Huq (literature)
 Syed Hasan Imam (film) 
 Subhash Dutta (film)
 Ali Zaker (drama)
 Monirul Islam (fine arts)
 Husna Banu Khanam (music)
 Fakir Alamgir (music)
 A B M Musa (journalism)
 K G Mustafa (journalism)
 Altamas Ahmed (dance)

Sports
 South Asian (Federation) Games:
 Bangladesh participated in the 1999 South Asian Federation Games held in Kathmandu, Nepal from 25 September to 4 October 1999. With 2 golds, 10 silvers and 35 bronzes Bangladesh ended the tournament at the fifth position in overall points table.
 International football:
 Bangladesh participated in 1999 South Asian Football Federation Gold Cup held in Goa, India, where they lost to India in the Final.
 The 2nd season of the Bangabandhu Cup was held in Dhaka from 27 August 1999 to 7 September 1999. Japan League XI went on to win the cup after defeating the Ghana U–23 team in the finals.
 Domestic football:
 Mohammedan SC won Dhaka League title while Abahani Ltd. became runner-up.
 Abahani Ltd. won the title of Bangladesh Federation Cup while Muktijoddha Sangsad KC became runner-up.
 Cricket:

 The final of the 1998–99 Asian Test Championship was played at Dhaka in March 1999, in which Pakistan won against Sri Lanka.
 Later that month, Bangladesh hosted Kenya and Zimbabwe for the List A Meril International Tournament which was won convincingly by Zimbabwe.
 Bangladesh participated in 1999 Cricket World Cup held in England from 14 May - 20 June. Bangladesh did not progress from the group stage, but they managed to defeat Scotland and Pakistan in the tournament. The win against Pakistan was Bangladesh's first win in ODI format against any test playing nation. Khaled Mahmud was the man of the match for his all-round performance in that landmark win.
 In October, West Indies led by Brian Lara played a single first-class match against the Bangladesh national team, which was drawn. The teams also played a two-match series of Limited Overs Internationals (LOI) which West Indies won 2–0.
 In October and November, an England A team visited Bangladesh and played three matches against the Bangladesh National team. Two of these were first-class matches which were drawn. England A won the limited overs match by 5 wickets.
 The National Cricket League was launched in November 1999.

Births
 10 September – Mahbubur Rahman Sufil, footballer
 7 October – Mabia Akhter, weightlifter

Deaths
 27 January – Satya Saha, composer and musician (b. 1934)
 24 February – Ahmed Sharif, educationist, writer and scholar of medieval Bengali literature (b. 1921)
 18 July – Syed Najmuddin Hashim, journalist, politician and writer (b. 1925)
 18 October – Mahanambrata Brahmachari, Hindu monk (b. 1904)
 1 November – Dewan Mohammad Azraf, philosopher and author (b. 1908)
 20 November – Sufia Kamal, poet (b. 1911) 
 28 November – Abdur Razzaq, national professor (b. 1914)

See also 
 1990s in Bangladesh
 List of Bangladeshi films of 1999
 Timeline of Bangladeshi history

References